Cristian Bermúdez (born 30 January 1973) is a Guatemalan sports shooter. He competed in the men's 10 metre running target event at the 1992 Summer Olympics.

References

1973 births
Living people
Guatemalan male sport shooters
Olympic shooters of Guatemala
Shooters at the 1992 Summer Olympics
Place of birth missing (living people)